The Death of Vivek Oji is a 2020 fiction novel by Nigerian author Akwaeke Emezi. It was published on 4 August 2020 by Riverhead books, it narrates the life of Vivek Oji until his death. It is Emezi's second adult novel after Freshwater and the book received critical attention and was an instant New York Times best seller.

Plot 
The novel is set in southeastern Nigeria during the 1980s and ’90s. The novel begins with the death of Vivek Oji and is told through a series of flashback in a nonlinear narrative. Born on the day of his grandmother, Ahunna's, death, Vivek becomes solidified to her by the starfish-shaped scar on Vivek's foot that resembles Ahunna’s, Vivek’s grandmother. Raised by a distant father and an understanding but overprotective mother, Vivek suffers disorienting blackouts, moments of disconnection between self and surroundings. As adolescence gives way to adulthood, Vivek finds solace in friendships with the warm, boisterous daughters of the Nigerwives, foreign-born women married to Nigerian men.

But Vivek's closest bond is with Osita, the worldly, high-spirited cousin whose teasing confidence masks a guarded private life. As their relationship deepens—and Osita struggles to understand Vivek's escalating crisis—the mystery gives way to a heart-stopping act of violence in a moment of exhilarating freedom.

Themes

Self identity and Gender 
The novel deals with self identity which the eponymous character Vivek faces as he comes to terms with his true identity and gender and believes he should be free to be who he is and what he wants without disturbances from others.

Homosexuality 
The novel explore the views of homosexuality in Nigeria as it is a criminal offence and the stigma attached to it. It also talks about closeted gay people who are afraid of coming out and are yet to come in terms with their sexuality.

Reception 
The book received generally positive reception with several media outlet including The New York Times, The Washington Post, NPR, USA Today, praising Emezi's creativity. It was an instant New York Times bestseller. In a positive review the Los Angeles Times called it "a relatively slim book that contains as wide a range of experience as any saga". The New York Times Book Review called the novel “[A] dazzling, devastating story . . . A puzzle wrapped in beautiful language, raising questions of identity and loyalty that are as unanswerable as they are important.” 

A starred review by the Kirkus called it "Vividly written and deeply affecting".

References 

Nigerian English-language novels
Nigerian fantasy novels
Novels with transgender themes
2020s LGBT novels
Nigerian LGBT novels
Novels set in Nigeria
Novels set in the 1980s
Novels set in the 1990s
Novels by Akwaeke Emezi
2020 Nigerian novels
Riverhead Books books